The 2001 Heineken Trophy women's doubles tennis tournament was won by Ruxandra Dragomir Ilie and Nadia Petrova. They defeated Kim Clijsters and Miriam Oremans 7–6(7–5), 6–7(5–7), 6–4 in the final.
Erika deLone and Nicole Pratt were the defending champions, but deLone did not compete that year. Pratt partnered with Rachel McQuillan and they lost in the quarterfinals to Ilie and Petrova.

Seeds

Draw

Draw

References

External links
 Official results archive (ITF)
 Official results archive (WTA)

Women's Doubles
Doubles